The Pasir Ris–Punggol Group Representation Constituency is a five-member Group Representation Constituency (GRC) in the north-eastern region of Singapore. The constituency currently consists of Pasir Ris and parts of the Punggol town area. The GRC comprises 5 constituencies: Pasir Ris Central, Pasir Ris East, Pasir Ris West, Punggol Shore as well as Punggol Coast. The current MPs are from the People's Action Party (PAP) Teo Chee Hean, Janil Puthucheary, Mohamed Sharael Taha, Yeo Wan Ling and Desmond Tan.

History 

Its first contest happened in 2006 with the opponent being Singapore Democratic Alliance. For the 2011 general election, the incumbent People's Action Party announced that their team would be led by Teo Chee Hean, and include then-Senior Parliamentary Secretary Teo Ser Luck, Penny Low, as well as new candidates Janil Puthucheary, Gan Thiam Poh and Zainal Sapari. In the 2015 general election, Penny Low retired from politics and new candidates Ng Chee Meng and Sun Xueling joined the team.

In the 2020 general election, the GRC was reduced to five members, with a newly formed constituency called Punggol West SMC carved out from the boundaries of Pasir-Ris Punggol GRC and Sengkang Central ward carved out to become part of the new Sengkang GRC, the Tampines retail park (part of the Pasir Ris area) was also redrawn into Tampines GRC.

Members of Parliament

Electoral results

Elections in 2020s

Elections in 2010s

Elections in 2000s

References

2011 General Election's result
2006 General Election's result
2001 General Election's result

Singaporean electoral divisions
Hougang
Pasir Ris
Paya Lebar
Punggol
Sengkang